Weiquan lawyers, or rights protection lawyers, refer to a small but influential movement of lawyers, legal practitioners, scholars and activists who help Chinese citizens to assert their constitutional, civil rights and/or public interest through litigation and legal activism. Weiquan lawyers represents many cases regarding labour rights, land rights, official corruption, victims of torture, migrants' rights.

Since the 1980s, as China's leadership became cognizant of the importance of the legal system and legal profession to advance economic development, training for lawyers dramatically increased. From 1986 to 1992, the number of lawyers in the country more than doubled from 21,500 to 45,000,  and by 2008 had reached 143,000.

The proportion of Weiquan lawyers is very small, relative the number of legal professionals in China. The number of lawyers actively focusing on civil rights issues has been estimated by legal scholar Teng Biao to number "only a few dozen." The lawyers face considerable personal and professional obstacles, and Weiquan lawyering demands substantial commitment to their cause. According to Fu Hualing and Richard Cullen, “Weiquan lawyers act principally out of commitment, not because of any financial concerns. They accept Weiquan cases to pursue their cause, and typically charge no legal fees.” The lawyers often face threats, harassment, and even detention when taking on cases, and they find themselves targets of repression ahead of sensitive events.

Types of Weiquan lawyers 
Weiquan activists include law professors with university teaching positions—including He Weifang, Xu Zhiyong, and Teng Biao—professional lawyers, and “barefoot lawyers,” who are self-taught and often lack any formal legal education.  Several of China's more high-profile Weiquan lawyers fall into the latter category, including Guo Feixiong and Chen Guangcheng.  Many barefoot lawyers are peasants who teach themselves enough law to file civil complaints, engage in litigation, and educate fellow citizens about their rights.

Because corporate law firms are generally not hospitable to Weiquan lawyers and legal aid workers operate within the government system, Weiquan lawyers in large cities tend to work as solo practitioners in partnership firms with other like-minded lawyers. The Beijing Global Law Firm and Yitong Law Firm are examples of such organizations.

Rana Siu Inboden and William Inboden note that a disproportionate number of influential Weiquan lawyers identify with the Christian faith, including Gao Zhisheng, Chen Guangcheng, Zheng Enchong, and Li Heping, among others.

Different approaches 
There are at least two distinctive (and sometimes competing) approaches to Weiquan activism. Among Weiquan lawyers, the pragmatists (or consequentialists) are more deferential to the existing legal systems and institutions, and only pursue courses of actions that are likely to produce incremental improvements and reforms. These activists may reject approaches that are liable to be met with official reprisals. By contrast, the "radical" Weiquan activists (those adopting a deontological approach) view rights defending as a moral obligation that is to be pursued regardless of potential consequences. Radical lawyers such as Gao Zhisheng are more inclined to take on the most "sensitive" cases—such as those of Falun Gong adherents—simply because it is the "right thing to do," even though the prospects of success are minimal. A pragmatist may become radicalized once they encounter the limits of possible reform.

See also

Human rights in the People's Republic of China
Protest and dissent in the People's Republic of China
China National Anti-Demolition Home Alliance
Deng Yujiao incident

References

External links
The emergence of the weiquan movement, Human Rights Watch
Chinese Lawyers in United States

Political movements in China
Human rights in China
Weiquan movement
Chinese law
Civil rights activists